Modera may refer to:

Modera House, a stately home in Colombo, Sri Lanka
Hotel Zags Portland, a hotel in Portland, Oregon previously known as Hotel Modera

See also
Modara, a municipal ward of Colombo
Moderna, an American pharmaceutical company
Modena, a city in Italy
Madeira, an autonomous region of Portugal
Modern (disambiguation)